Cobaki Lakes is a suburb of Tweed Heads, located in the Northern Rivers Region of New South Wales, along the Queensland and New South Wales border.

History 
Cobaki Lakes is situated in the Bundjalung traditional Aboriginal country.

Cobaki Lakes was approved in May 2011 by the New South Wales Northern Joint Regional Planning Panel, appointed by the NSW Government and Tweed Shire.

References 

Towns in New South Wales
Northern Rivers